HMS Thais was a ten-gun  launched in 1829. She immediately became a Post Office Packet Service packet, sailing from Falmouth. She was lost in 1833.

Career
Thais replaced  at Falmouth, serving as a Post Office packet.

Thais, Lieutenant Charles Church, sailed from Falmouth on 12 December 1833, bound for Halifax, Nova Scotia. She was last seen southwest of Ireland. In March and April 1834, her wreckage washed ashore at Galway, Ireland. It is presumed that she foundered soon after her last sighting.

Citations

References
 
 

 

 

Cherokee-class brig-sloops
1829 ships
Ships built in Pembroke Dock
Maritime incidents in December 1833